Hatherden is a village and civil parish in the Test Valley district of Hampshire, England. Its nearest town is Andover, which lies approximately 3.3 miles (4.5 km) south from the village. The village has a Primary School and one pub, named the Old Bell and Crown. At the 2011 census the Post Office say the population was included in the civil parish of Tangley.

It is also a short walk to The Fox Inn which is well known for its Thai restaurant.

Hatherden is also within an Area of Outstanding Natural Beauty

References

 http://www.foxinntangley.co.uk/

Villages in Hampshire
Test Valley